Sucé-sur-Erdre (literally Sucé on Erdre) is a commune in the Loire-Atlantique department in western France.

Its name comes from the Latin sulcus, meaning "furrow", and the Celtic erdam, meaning "small river".

Sucé-sur-Erdre, as its name indicates, is located on the river Erdre, which at this point is near its confluence with the Loire. The town was fairly small (2,000 or so) for quite some time until it began to be absorbed into the greater suburbia of Nantes. As of 2019, it has about 7,200 inhabitants, a significant portion of which commute to Nantes. In general, the area is middle-class with a good portion of upper-middle class and upper-class homes, especially on the river banks.

Sucé-sur-Erdre is relatively well known in the area for its scenic river landscapes, and its many water sports opportunities, including fishing, sailing, windsurfing in Mazerolles (Funboard44), kayaking, and water skiing. It has essentially no industry, the main employer is a large convalescence home. There are many shops (butcher, baker, etc...) and one small supermarket.

Sucé-sur-Erdre has had few encounters with history, its greatest claim to fame being that the famous philosopher René Descartes spent some time there (although this is not very well documented). It has a few old houses, but the church is modern (late nineteenth century. There are many picturesque farm houses in the area, although they are disappearing quickly due to the accelerated modernization brought by the expansion of Nantes.

Population

The inhabitants of Sucé-sur-Erdre are called Sucéens.

Facts and statistics
 Sister cities: Cricklade (United Kingdom), Kleinblittersdorf (Germany)
 Climate: mild, often wet

See also
Communes of the Loire-Atlantique department
Official site of Sucé sur Erdre (in French)
Official site of Sucé sur Erdre (in English via Google Translate)

References

Sucesurerdre